The Alpe Veglia and Alpe Devero Natural Park was established in 1995 and is in the Ossola valley, in the Province of Verbania, Italy.

History
The hollows are geologically and mineralogically interesting, since they testify long period geological process: the presence of remainders of ancient glacier such as the Ghiacciaio del Leone, the Ghiacciaio d'Aurona dall'alpe Veglia or the Ghiacciaio della Rossa prove the glacial origin of the hollows.

The mineralogy is interesting: there are asbecasite, cafarsite and cervandonite.

Establishment of the park
The park has been established with the L.R. n. 32 on 14 March 1995 joining two already existing parks:

Alpe Veglia Nature Park
The Alpe Veglia Nature Park was the first regional park, established in 1978 (L.R. 14/78) on the Italian side of the Alpe Veglia at an altitude of 1750 m. It was 4120 hectares wide including the municipalities of Varzo and Trasquera, adjoining the Canton of Valais in Switzerland.

Alpe Devero Nature Park

The Alpe Devero Nature Park was established in 1990 (L.R. 49/90) in order to protect the alpine environment on the Italian side of the Lepontine Alps.

The Alpe Devero is in the Baceno municipality.

SCI and SPA
The Alpe Devero has been established as Special Protection Area (SPA) in the Natura 2000 network.

Both Alpe Veglia and Devero have been proposed as Site of Community Importance in 1995.

Territory 
The area include two wide U-shaped valleys.

The Alpe Veglia is surrounded by Helsenhorn (3.272 m), Hillehorn (3.156 m), Bortelhorn (3.192 m), Punta d'Aurona (2.984), Wasenhorn (3.246 m) and monte Leone (3.553 m). Every mountain has his ows glacier.

The Alpe Devero is surrounded by Ofenhorn (3.235 m), Albrunhorn (2.840 m), Punta Valdeserta (2.939 m), Punta della Rossa (2.888 m), Schwarzhorn (3.108 m), Scherbadung (3.155 m) and Pizzo Cornera (3.083 m).

Municipalities
Baceno,
Crodo,
Trasquera,
Varzo.

Flora 
The flora is homogeneous, but the main tree is the larch. Throughout the whole park larchwoods and some alderwood can be seen. Above 2000 m altitude there are mostly Rhododendron and dwarf shrub nourishing insects such as honey bees, wasps, bumblebees and flies. It is possible to spot Picea abies, but they are very rare.

Fauna
The fauna of the park is mostly composed by typical alpine animals, such as steinbock, Red deer, Roe deer, chamois, fox, red squirrel, Eastern gray squirrel, Golden eagle, European badger and many others. In the lakes or rivers there are different fishes such as trouts and graylings.

See also 
 CoEur - In the heart of European paths

References

External links

Official website
 AlpeVeglia.it
 AlpeDevero.it
 News about the park

Parks in Piedmont
Tourist attractions in Piedmont
Alpe Devero